Keith Rowen (born September 2, 1952) is an American football coach. He served as the offensive coordinator for the Arizona Cardinals in 2005 until he was fired in October 2006 the day after the Cardinals lost to the Bears after leading by 20 points.  He then moved to Atlanta, where he was the Falcons' tight end coach for the 2007 season, before moving to San Francisco for an office job with the Oakland Raiders.

As a player, he was drafted by the Philadelphia Eagles as a guard in the 11th round of the 1975 NFL Draft.

Rowen is the son of Vic Rowen, who was the head coach at San Francisco State University from 1961 to 1989.

References

1952 births
Living people
American football offensive guards
Atlanta Falcons coaches
Arizona Cardinals coaches
Cleveland Browns coaches
Indianapolis Colts coaches
Kansas City Chiefs coaches
Minnesota Vikings coaches
New England Patriots coaches
Oakland Raiders coaches
Stanford Cardinal football players
Sportspeople from New York City